Ion Cernea (born 21 October 1933) is a retired bantamweight Greco-Roman wrestler from Romania. Between 1960 and 1965 he earned two Olympic and two world championship medals, winning the world title in 1965. He retired the same year to become a wrestling coach and international referee, and was present in this capacity at all major international wrestling competitions between 1972 and 1988.

Cernea is married to the singer Irina Loghin; they have a son and a daughter.

References

1936 births
Living people
Olympic wrestlers of Romania
Wrestlers at the 1960 Summer Olympics
Wrestlers at the 1964 Summer Olympics
Romanian male sport wrestlers
Olympic silver medalists for Romania
Olympic bronze medalists for Romania
Olympic medalists in wrestling
Medalists at the 1964 Summer Olympics
Medalists at the 1960 Summer Olympics
People from Argeș County